U Magazine may refer to:
 U Magazine (Ireland), an Irish lifestyle magazine published by Irish Studio publications
 U Magazine (Hong Kong), (Chinese: U周刊 - "U Weekly") a travel magazine published by Hong Kong Economic Times Holdings